WTLJ (channel 54) is a religious television station licensed to Muskegon, Michigan, United States, serving West Michigan as an owned-and-operated station of Tri-State Christian Television (TCT). The station's transmitter is located in Allendale Charter Township in Ottawa County, just southwest of Grand Valley State University. Its signal is relayed on translator station WJGP-LD (channel 25; originally W24BO channel 24) in Kalamazoo.

Until June 2018, the station aired its own locally produced programs, Ask the Pastor and Down Home, from a studio adjacent to its transmitter. This ended with the elimination of the Federal Communications Commission (FCC)'s Main Studio Rule earlier in the year and a decision by TCT's operators to consolidate all programming operations at its headquarters in Marion, Illinois.

History
The UHF channel 54 allocation in Michigan was originally assigned to Lansing. It was occupied by DuMont affiliate WILS, which later became WTOM-TV (call letters now used on channel 4 in Cheboygan), and was on the air from 1953 to 1956. The channel 54 allocation was then reassigned to Muskegon. Full-power station WMKG-TV broadcast in the late 1960s from the Occidental Hotel in downtown Muskegon. That station, which operated as an independent station and relied heavily on live, local programming, had left the air by the mid-1970s.

In the early-1980s, WTLJ was originally assigned the call letters WMKT with the intention of focusing on the Muskegon and Holland areas. That station was never built (Muskegon has its own station, WMKG-CD, which fulfills this purpose).

In November 1986, Springfield, Ohio–based Miami Valley Christian Television launched WTLJ, as a Christian-oriented independent station. The station would eventually be sold to its present owners, Tri-State Christian Television. The history of its Kalamazoo repeater, WJGP-LD, is unknown, other than the fact that its application to move its signal from UHF channel 24 to channel 26 was approved in December 1998; the channel switch occurred in January 2002 to facilitate WTLJ's eventual digital channel 24.

The station was receivable in analog on the western shore of Lake Michigan in the Wisconsin cities of Sheboygan and Milwaukee because of channel 54's transmitter being close to the Lake Michigan shore, although TCT does not explicitly market to those cities or have any cable coverage. With the termination on March 4, 2009 of the analog channel 24 signal of Milwaukee's WCGV, the station's digital signal is also easily picked up in Wisconsin.

WTLJ is carried on AcenTek systems serving Buckley, Copemish, Hoxeyville, Mesick, Old Mission, South Boardman, and Thompsonville (all located in the Traverse City market).

WTLJ formerly collaborated with the Ottawa County Department of Corrections to allow probationers to operate the station to receive community service credits and complete their sentences.

Technical information

Subchannels
The station's digital signal is multiplexed:

Translator

Analog-to-digital conversion
WTLJ shut down its analog signal, over UHF channel 54, on June 12, 2009, as part of the federally mandated transition from analog to digital television. The station's digital signal remained on its pre-transition UHF channel 24, using PSIP to display WTLJ's virtual channel as 54 on digital television receivers, which was among the high band UHF channels (52-69) that were removed from broadcasting use as a result of the transition.

References

WTLJ-TV Channel 54 Muskegon. Michigan's Radio & TV Broadcast Guide.

External links
TCT Network

Television channels and stations established in 1986
1986 establishments in Michigan
Muskegon, Michigan
Ottawa County, Michigan
TLJ
Allendale, Michigan
Tri-State Christian Television affiliates
TheGrio affiliates